Christopher James Moore (born 17 January 1984) is an English former professional footballer. He is currently a youth coach at Sunderland.

Career
Moore was born in Newcastle upon Tyne. He began his football career in Newcastle United's Academy, then played non-League football for Bishop Auckland and Whitley Bay before taking a degree in journalism at Rutgers University in New Jersey. On returning to England in 2008 he rejoined Whitley Bay, and, after a one-game stint at Durham City, was part of their FA Vase-winning team in 2009. In March 2010, he turned professional for the first time, signing a contract with Football League Two club Darlington to run until the end of the 2010–11 season. He made his debut in the Football League two days later as a half-time substitute as Darlington lost 2–0 at Northampton Town.

In September 2010 he joined Northern League club Spennymoor Town on what turned out "an impressive month"'s loan, scoring three goals from six games (one from five in the League). Moore was part of Darlington's FA Trophy winning side, playing all 120 minutes against Mansfield Town on 7 May 2011. He was not offered a new contract and was released by Darlington a week later.

In July 2011, Moore went on trial at Gateshead. He played in five pre-season friendlies before signing an initial six-month contract on 27 July 2011. He made his Gateshead debut as a second-half substitute on 13 August in their 3–2 win over Kidderminster Harriers at Aggborough. He scored his first goal for Gateshead in his first start 10 days later in a 3–1 win against Southport at Haig Avenue. On 31 December 2011, Moore had his contract extended until the end of the season. Moore was released by Gateshead on 30 April 2012.

Moore joined Barrow in August 2012, and subsequently moved onto Darlington 1883, Blyth Spartans, Consett and Ashington, before becoming manager of Durham City in November 2015. He left Durham in October 2016, and subsequently coached at Whitley Bay and North Shields. In May 2018 he was appointed manager of Consett. In May 2019 he left the club to join Sunderland as a youth coach.

Career statistics

Club

A.  The "League" column constitutes appearances and goals (including those as a substitute) in the English Football League, Football Conference, Northern Premier League and Northern League.
B.  The "Other" column constitutes appearances and goals (including those as a substitute) in the FA Trophy, FA Vase, Durham Challenge Cup, Northumberland Senior Cup, Northern Premier League Challenge Cup and Northern League Cup.

References

External links
 

1984 births
Living people
Footballers from Newcastle upon Tyne
English footballers
Association football wingers
Newcastle United F.C. players
Bishop Auckland F.C. players
Whitley Bay F.C. players
Durham City A.F.C. players
Darlington F.C. players
Spennymoor Town F.C. players
Gateshead F.C. players
Barrow A.F.C. players
Northern Football League players
English Football League players
National League (English football) players
Blyth Spartans A.F.C. players
Consett A.F.C. players
Ashington A.F.C. players
English football managers
Durham City A.F.C. managers
Consett A.F.C. managers
Sunderland A.F.C. non-playing staff